Banta Berensyah is a folktale from Aceh. Banta Berensyah is the name of a kid. He tries to win a competition that is made by the king. The prize is to be married to the king's daughter.

See also 
Aceh

References 

Aceh
Indonesian folklore